Nooluvally is a village in Thrissur District in Kerala.

References

Villages in Thrissur district